John J. Gallagher (born May 13, 1944) is an American politician who served in the New Jersey General Assembly from 1974 to 1978.

References

1944 births
Living people
Democratic Party members of the New Jersey General Assembly